The following list includes notable people who were born or have lived in Newport, Rhode Island.

Notable people born in Newport

18th century 

 Vice-Admiral Sir Jahleel Brenton, Royal Navy
 William Ellery Channing, one of the foremost Unitarian preachers
 Caleb Gardner, captain and consul of French Empire
 Edward Malbone, artist and miniaturist
 David Olyphant, China merchant and member of American Board of Commissioners for Foreign Missions
 Christopher Raymond Perry, naval officer in American Revolution
 Solomon Southwick, publisher of Newport Mercury and advocate for Patriot cause in American Revolution

19th century 

 D. Putnam Brinley, artist
 Clarence G. Child, scholar
 William Ennis, U.S. Army brigadier general
 Thomas Harper Ince, actor
 Clarence R. King, geologist, mountaineer, and first director of the U.S. Geological Survey (1879–1881); noted for exploration of Sierra Nevada
 Ida Lewis, lighthouse keeper credited with saving 18 lives in Newport Harbor; received national attention and numerous honors; a Coast Guard buoy tender bears her name
 David Melville, credited with first gas street lighting in the United States
 Matthew C. Perry, Navy Commodore who opened Japan to the West with the Convention of Kanagawa in 1854, under the threat of military force
 Cornelia Bryce Pinchot, native of Newport who became a conservationist, Progressive politician, women’s rights activist, and First Lady of Pennsylvania
 Cynthia Taggart, poet
 Charles C. Van Zandt, 34th Governor of Rhode Island

20th century 

 Harry Anderson, actor and comedian (Night Court)
 Margaret Frances Andrews, socialite and show dog breeder
 Allen Bestwick, NASCAR and IndyCar Series announcer
 Nadia Bjorlin, soap opera actress (Days of Our Lives)
 Frank Corridon, pitcher for Chicago Cubs, Philadelphia Phillies, and St. Louis Cardinals; invented now-illegal pitch, the spitball
 Tanya Donelly, musician; vocalist for Rhode Island-based bands Belly and Throwing Muses; guitarist for the band The Breeders
 Charlie Fern, White House speechwriter, journalist
 Van Johnson, actor, known best for "all-American" roles in MGM films during World War II
 Lawson Little, 1940 U.S. Open golf champion
 Mena Suvari, actress, known for role in 1999 film American Beauty
 Leon Wilkeson, bass guitarist

Notable people who lived or worked in Newport

17th century 

Benedict Arnold, Governor of Rhode Island
John Clarke, Baptist minister and drafter of Royal Charter
William Coddington, Governor of Rhode Island
Nicholas Easton, Governor of Rhode Island
George Gardiner, early settler of Rhode Island, early Newport resident

18th century 

 George Berkeley, philosopher
 Louis Alexandre Berthier, French army officer, later Marshal of France and Napoleon's chief of staff
 William Ellery, signer of Declaration of Independence
 Robert Feke, portrait painter
 Peter Harrison, architect
 Samuel Hopkins, Congregational minister, Calvinist theologian, leader for abolition of slave trade
 Aaron Lopez, merchant
 Louis-Marie, vicomte de Noailles, French army officer
 Charles Theodore Pachelbel, first organist of Newport's Trinity Church; son of Johann Pachelbel
 Jean-Baptiste Donatien de Vimeur, comte de Rochambeau, French general
 William Selby, organist at Trinity Church, composer
 John Smybert, artist
 Ezra Stiles, minister, diarist, and President of Yale
 Gilbert Stuart, portrait painter
 Isaac Touro, hazzan at Synagogue
 Judah Touro, merchant and philanthropist

19th century to 1885 

George Bancroft, historian, Secretary of the Navy, diplomat, and summer resident
August Belmont, financier 
Ambrose Burnside, Army officer stationed at Fort Adams, later Civil War general, governor, senator
Julia Ward Howe, author and summer resident
Henry James, author
William James, philosopher and Harvard professor
John Kensett, artist
Clement C. Moore, summer resident and author of "'Twas the Night before Christmas"
Levi P. Morton, summer resident and donor of Morton Park, later Vice President of the United States
Commodore Oliver Hazard Perry, hero of War of 1812
William Trost Richards, artist
Milton H. Sanford, textile magnate and thoroughbred racehorse owner
Judah Touro, philanthropist
Richard Upjohn, architect

The Gilded Age, 1885–1914 

Caroline Webster Schermerhorn Astor, socialite
Charles D. Barney, socialite, banker, founder of Smith Barney Brokerage
Alva Belmont, socialite and leader of women's rights movement
August Belmont, financier
Oliver Hazard Perry Belmont, socialite, builder of Belcourt Castle
James Gordon Bennett, Jr., newspaper publisher and yachtsman
Ogden Codman, designer
Richard Morris Hunt, architect
William Morris Hunt, artist
John LaFarge, artist
Pierre Lorillard, tobacco manufacturer
Rear Admiral Stephen B. Luce, founder of Naval War College
Captain Alfred Thayer Mahan, naval historian and strategist
Ward McAllister, flamboyant raconteur of high society, coined the term 'the 400' for the New York social elite
Charles McKim, architect
Edith B. Price, writer and illustrator
H.H. Richardson, architect
Horace Trumbauer, architect
James J. Van Alen, summer resident and Ambassador to Italy
Alva Vanderbilt, wife of William K. Vanderbilt; early feminist, active in women's suffrage movement
Consuelo Vanderbilt, daughter of W.K. and Alva Vanderbilt; Duchess of Marlborough 
Cornelius Vanderbilt II, heir to Vanderbilt fortune, Chairman of New York Central Railroad
Frederick Vanderbilt, heir to Vanderbilt fortune, philanthropist
William Kissam Vanderbilt, heir to Vanderbilt fortune, yachtsman
Edith Wharton, author
Stanford White, architect
Thornton Wilder, author, playwright; his 1973 novel Theophilus North is set in Newport; served briefly in Army's Coast Artillery Corps at Fort Adams in World War I

20th century, 1914–2000 

 John Jacob Astor VI, socialite, heir to Astor family fortune, summer resident
 Admiral Jeremy Michael Boorda, 25th Chief of Naval Operations
 John Nicholas Brown, socialite, yachtsman and philanthropist
 Doris Duke, tobacco heiress and philanthropist
 Joanna Going, actress, Another World, House of Cards
 Paul Gordon, musician with Goo Goo Dolls, New Radicals, The B-52's
 Kristin Hersh, musician, vocalist for Rhode Island-based band Throwing Muses, 50 Foot Wave; solo artist
 Antony Kloman, painter
 Jane Pickens Langley, singer, entertainer and philanthropist
 Elaine Lorillard, summer resident, founder of Newport Jazz Festival
 Perle Mesta, socialite, political hostess and U.S. Ambassador to Luxembourg
 MacGillivray Milne, 27th Governor of American Samoa, 1936–1938
 Diane Nelson, president of DC Entertainment 
 Fleet Admiral Chester Nimitz, Commander, U.S. Pacific Fleet, 1942–1945; Chief of Naval Operations
 Jacqueline Kennedy Onassis, First Lady of the United States, summer resident
 Claiborne Pell, socialite and U.S. Senator 1961–1997
 Alfredo Sciarrotta, silversmith and undersea weapons expert
 Admiral William Sims, commander of U.S. Naval Forces in Europe, 1917–1919
 Carolyn Mary Skelly; owned Bois Dore Mansion; eccentric daughter of William Grove Skelly; oil heiress, dubbed the "most robbed woman in the US" by the Boston Globe; socialite; hosted fundraisers for President George H.W. Bush, & Texas Governor John Connally
 Admiral Raymond Spruance, the victor of Midway; President, Naval War College 
 Jimmy Van Alen, summer resident and founder of International Tennis Hall of Fame
 Margaret Van Alen Bruguiere, socialite, art collector; niece of Frederick Vanderbilt
 Harold Vanderbilt, yachtsman, bridge player, inventor of contract bridge
 Martha Sharp Crawford (Sunny) von Bülow, socialite, heiress (resided with husband Claus von Bülow at Clarendon Court on Bellevue Avenue)

21st century, 2001–present 

Richard Hatch, first winner of the reality television show Survivor
Sheldon Whitehouse, U.S. Senator, 2007–present
Dede Wilsey, San Franciscan socialite, summer resident and philanthropist
Richard Saul Wurman, architect, graphic designer, founder of the TED Conferences

References 

Newport, Rhode Island
Newport